Banchamek is a Thai boxing gym. The name may refer to:

Buakaw Banchamek (born 1982), Muay Thai kickboxer from Thailand 
Superbon Banchamek (born 1990), Muay Thai kickboxer from Thailand